Jim A. Mortram (born 10 September 1971) is a British social documentary photographer and writer, based in Dereham, Norfolk. His ongoing project using photography and writing, Small Town Inertia, records the lives of a number of disadvantaged and marginalised people living near to his home, in order to tell stories he believes are under-reported. This work is published on his website, in a few zines published in 2013, and in the book Small Town Inertia (2017).

Small Town Inertia
Mortram began the Small Town Inertia website in 2006 with the "Market Town" stories. Its name is a reference to the market town of Dereham, where he lives, fifteen miles west of the city of Norwich in Norfolk. Through photography, his writing and the subject's own words, Mortram records the lives of the disadvantaged and marginalised, making repeated visits with a number of people living within three miles of his home. Small Town Inertia tells stories of "isolation, poverty, drug abuse, homelesness, self-harm, mental illness, juvenile crime, and epilepsy", that Mortram believes are otherwise under-reported.

Dave Stelfox wrote in The Guardian that "Mortram's rich, black-and-white images possess a timeless quality that invites easy comparison with the classic documentary work of such British photographers as Chris Steele Perkins, Paul Trevor and Chris Killip."

Publications

Publications by Mortram
Small Town Inertia. Liverpool: Bluecoat. With a poem by Jamie Thrashivoulou, "A Privatised Map of Deprivation", and essays by Paul Mason, "A Memento of the Dark Times", and Lewis K. Bush, "A War of Poverty". Hardback, 2017; . Paperback, 2018; .

Zines by Mortram
Electric Tears and All Their Portent. Southport: Café Royal, 2013. Edition of 150 copies.
Living with Epilepsy. Southport: Café Royal, 2013. Edition of 150 copies.
Small Town Inertia: Diary Entries. Southport: Café Royal, 2013. Edition of 150 copies. With a short text by George Szirtes.
Second edition. Southport: Café Royal, 2022.
Small Town Inertia: Diary Entries 2. Southport: Café Royal, 2022. With a short essay by Michael Sheen.

Publications with contributions by Mortram
Professional Photography: The New Global Landscape Explained. Oxford: Focal, 2014. By Grant Scott. . With contributions from Mortram, Alicia Bruce, Peter Dench, Chris Floyd, and Niall McDiarmid.

Solo exhibitions
Small Town Inertia, Bank Street Arts, Sheffield, 2013; Photoville, New York City, 2013; Red Light Gallery, Norwich, 2013; Arts Centre, Edge Hill University, Liverpool, 2014; Camden Image Gallery, Camden, London, 2014; Side Gallery, Newscastle, 2019

Awards
2013: one of twenty photographers credited by the British Journal of Photography as "Ones to Watch" in 2013

Notes

References

External links
Small Town Inertia website

Mortram at Documenting Britain
Small Town Inertia: portraits of a nation in need – gallery of photographs at The Guardian
What it’s like to live on the fringes of British society: Small Town Inertia – Mortram describes how he works on Small Town Inertia, for Huck magazine, 2014
Mortram interview with United Nations of Photography, 2016 (16 minute video)

1971 births
Living people
Photographers from Norfolk
British portrait photographers
Social documentary photographers
Place of birth missing (living people)
21st-century British photographers